The West Baden Sprudels were an early Negro league baseball team that played as an independent club owned by the Burnett-Pollard-Rogers Baseball Club Company, where Edward Rogers was the Chief Officer.

Founding 

The Sprudels appear to have been from Springs Valley, Indiana, but they often frequented baseball diamonds near the West Baden Springs Hotel in West Baden Springs, Indiana, and the French Lick Springs Hotel in French Lick, Indiana. Games started between the teams between 1907 and 1908. The team was managed by C. I. Taylor from 1910 to 1913.

Their name derived from a bottled water produced at the Hotel.  The Hotel bordered on a local salt lick and mineral spring and the minerals from the spring made the water act as an effective and marketable natural laxative.  The product was labeled as "Sprudel Water" (from German "Sprudelwasser" meaning "sparkling water").  Their frequent rivals, the French Lick Plutos, came from a hotel on the same spring that had also bottled the water and sold it as "Pluto Water".

Competition 

The West Baden Sprudels played long before the Negro National League formed in 1920, but still against many of the great pre-Negro league baseball teams of the day, including the Chicago American Giants, Indianapolis ABCs, Cuban Stars, Louisville White Sox, Chicago Union Giants, Chicago Giants, French Lick Plutos, and the Brooklyn All Stars.

Rosters

1910

1911

1912

1913

1914

1915

References

External links
 www.seamheads.com

Negro league baseball teams
Defunct baseball teams in Indiana
Baseball teams disestablished in 1915
Baseball teams established in 1910